Sancho Sánchez may refer to:

Sancho II Sánchez of Gascony (died ), duke
Sancho III Mitarra of Gascony (died ), duke, possibly son of previous
Sancho V Sánchez of Gascony (died ), duke
Sancho Sánchez (died ), a Navarrese magnate
Sancho VII of Navarre (died 1234), king